Walter Goldwater (July 29, 1907 – June 24, 1985) was an American antiquarian bookseller, who worked briefly at International Publishers before founding University Place Book Shop in Manhattan, part of "Book Row". He was also a co-founder and publisher of Dissent magazine and a noted tournament chess player.

Background

Walter Goldwater was born on July 29, 1907, in Harlem, New York.  His father, Dr. Abraham Goldwater, was a radical and knew prominent black activists including W. E. B. DuBois.  In 1927, after starting college at the City College of New York, Goldwater graduated from the University of Michigan.

Career

Initially, Goldwater took clerical jobs to support himself.

In 1930, Goldwater joined International Publishers, "the most prominent communist publishing organization in the United States," run by Alexander Trachtenberg.

In 1931, Goldwater and his wife Ethel, who had joined him in studying Russian, traveled to Moscow, USSR.  There, they helped set up the Cooperative Publishing Society of Foreign Workers.  Both then worked there as translators and editors.  Goldwater was a critic of Stalin, which landed him in trouble with authorities, after which the Goldwater's returned to New York in early 1932.

In 1932, Goldwater opened University Place Book Shop on "Book Row" at 821 Broadway at 12th Street (or at 69 University Place) with a loan from his uncle Jack Biblo (of Biblo & Tannen bookstore) of $600 (or his uncle Abe Sugarman).  The bookstore specialized in African, African-American, and Caribbean (West Indies) literature as well as used, old, and rare books.  Other specialties included chess, Russia, and radicalism.

In 1933, Arthur Spingarn, brother of NAACP founder Joel Spingarn, started a standing order for books by African-American authors.

Around 1932 or 1933, Whittaker Chambers tried to recruit Goldwater to open a bookstore near Columbia University to serve as a meeting place for Communist (Soviet) underground agents as well as mail drop.  Upon checking with the Communist Party USA at its headquarters on Union Square, he found the idea rejected by the Party because his knowledge of the Russian language looked suspicious.  Others whom Chambers tried to recruit in the same period included:  Herbert Solow, David Zabladowsky, Diana Trilling, and Robert Cantwell.

Goldwater purchased an estimated ten thousand "little magazines" (e.g., Bibelot, Black Cat, Yellow Book, and Philistine) from nearby Pratt bookshop.  Over time, he sold these to universities, including Yale University and the University of Connecticut.

Goldwater helped found the Antiquarian Booksellers' Association of America and collected books printed in the 15th century.

In 1950, Goldwater published a new edition of W. E. B. DuBois's Black Reconstruction.

In 1954, Goldwater joined Irving Howe and others in founding Dissent magazine.  He published the magazine for 15 years.

He collected and wrote about collecting Incunabula, which he later had auctioned by Swann Galleries before his death.

Personal life and death

Goldwater married Eleanor Lowenstein (died 1980), who was also an antiquarian. She ran the Corner Book Shop (102 Fourth Avenue at 11th Street), which specialized in cookbooks.  They had two children.

Goldwater and his friend Dwight Macdonald formed the bases for two characters in Mary McCarthy's 1949 novel The Oasis.

Goldwater was a "formidable" chess player who competed in New York tournaments and also served as president of the Marshall Chess Club in Greenwich Village.  He proudly lost to chess champion Bobby Fischer.

In later life, Goldwater helped broker manuscripts and collections regarding labor and the left to universities, particularly the Tamiment Library at New York University.

In 1993, a long interview was published in the Dictionary of Literary Biography Yearbook, in which Goldwater recounted all the booksellers he had known in his life.

Legacy

In his will, Goldwater left University Place Book Shop to long-time employee William French, who ran the shop from 1985 to 1988.  French had started working at the bookstore in 1960.  He left books to the New York Public Library and its Schomburg Center.  University Place Book Shop closed in 1995, mostly due to rising costs and a debt of $64,000 in unpaid rent.  French sold the remaining books to New York University.

Works
 Radical Periodicals in America, 1890–1950 (1977)
 "New York City Bookshops in the 1930s and 1940s: The Recollections of Walter Goldwater", Dictionary of Literary Biography Yearbook (1993)

See also
 Book Row
 Dissent magazine

References

External links
 New York City Bookshops in the 1930s and 1940s:  The Recollections of Walter Goldwater
 Brandeis University - Radical Pamphlet Collection
 University of California at Davis - The African American History Collection

1907 births
1985 deaths
American communists
People from New York City
University of Michigan alumni